Burdette is a town in Mississippi County, Arkansas, United States. The population was 140 at the 2020 census, down from 191 in 2010.

History

Burdette has its origins as a company town established by the Three States Lumber Company in the early 1900s.  Incorporated in 1905, the town was named for Alfred Burdette Wolverton, an early logger in the area. Three States completed a large sawmill in Burdette in 1906, and the Blytheville, Burdette, and Mississippi River Railroad connected the mill via rail to Wolverton Landing along the Mississippi River that same year.

A large agricultural operation, the Burdette Plantation, developed alongside the lumber operations. Beginning in the 1920s, these farms were utilized by the University of Arkansas for agricultural research focused on the improvement of cotton and corn yields. Several new cotton varieties, such as "Burdette Express" and "Burdette Lone Star", were developed in the Burdette area.

Geography
Burdette is located in northeastern Mississippi County at  (35.856818, -90.040113). The town's municipal boundaries stretch westward along AR 148 to Interstate 55 and eastward to U.S. Route 61.

Demographics

As of the 2010 United States Census, there were 191 people living in the town. The racial makeup of the town was 70.7% White, 20.9% Black, and 8.4% were Hispanic or Latino of any race.

As of the census of 2000, there were 129 people, 52 households, and 35 families living in the town. The population density was 75.5/km2 (194.5/mi2). There were 57 housing units at an average density of 33.3/km2 (85.9/mi2). The racial makeup of the town was 82.17% White, 17.05% Black or African American, and 0.78% from two or more races.

There were 52 households, out of which 25.0% had children under the age of 18 living with them, 57.7% were married couples living together, 3.8% had a female householder with no husband present, and 30.8% were non-families. 30.8% of all households were made up of individuals, and 1.9% had someone living alone who was 65 years of age or older. The average household size was 2.48 and the average family size was 3.06.

In the town, the population was spread out, with 23.3% under the age of 18, 8.5% from 18 to 24, 25.6% from 25 to 44, 35.7% from 45 to 64, and 7.0% who were 65 years of age or older. The median age was 40 years. For every 100 females, there were 101.6 males. For every 100 females age 18 and over, there were 115.2 males.

The median income for a household in the town was $40,625, and the median income for a family was $49,375. Males had a median income of $29,500 versus $9,250 for females. The per capita income for the town was $18,958. There were 10.3% of families and 11.2% of the population living below the poverty line, including 11.1% of under eighteens and none of those over 64.

Education
The town is served by Blytheville School District, including Blytheville High School.

The Burdette school district merged into the Blytheville district in 1971.

References

External links
 

Towns in Mississippi County, Arkansas
Towns in Arkansas
Company towns in Arkansas
Logging communities in the United States